Ne daj se, Nina (Don't Give Up, Nina) is a Croatian and Serbian television series, a re-made version of Colombian television series Yo soy Betty, la fea. The show had its premiere on 29 October 2007 in Serbia, on Fox televizija. RTL Televizija broadcast the show in early 2008 in its winter schedule from 3 January 2008. After 12 episodes, which were screened in the 45 minute format, RTL Televizija replaced its soap opera "Zabranjena ljubav" with "Ne daj se, Nina" in its time-slot. The show was broadcast daily from Monday to Friday, in a half hour format. The first season of the show was completed in 2008. The series was filmed in Zagreb (Croatia), Belgrade (Serbia), Bosnia & Herzegovina and North Macedonia.

Plot 
Nina Brlek is a kind, intelligent, and naive young woman. She grows up in Zagreb with her parents Vlado and Mira and her brother Davor. Brlek has excellent grades and perfect curriculum, but fails to find a good job because of her looks. She tries to get a job at H-Moda, a fashion company directed by Victor Glowatzky, who plans to retire, and pass his business to his son, David. This news is bad for David's nemesis Petar Vidic, who is the main editor of H-Moda's magazine Helena and his lover Monika. He is also Barbara Vidic's brother, David's fiancé.

Barbara hires her recently divorced friend, Patricija Vuckovic, who is pretty but not intelligent enough for the job of David's secretary. Barbara wants Patricija keeps an eye on David, who is a famous bachelor and womanizer. Nina gains the job of David's confidant secretary.

Cast

References

External links 
 
 Ne daj se, Nina! at rtl.hr

Yo soy Betty, la fea
2007 telenovelas
2008 telenovelas
2007 Croatian television series debuts
2008 Croatian television series endings
2007 Serbian television series debuts
2008 Serbian television series endings
Croatian television soap operas
Serbian drama television series
2000s Croatian television series
2000s Serbian television series
Television shows set in Serbia
Prva Srpska Televizija original programming